U-28 may refer to one of the following German submarines:

 , a Type U 27 submarine launched in 1913 and that served in the First World War until sunk on 2 September 1917
 During the First World War, Germany also had these submarines with similar names:
 , a Type UB II submarine launched in 1916 and surrendered on 24 November 1918
 , a Type UC II submarine launched in 1916 and surrendered on 12 February 1919
 , a Type VIIA submarine that served in the Second World War until sunk at pier on 17 March 1944; later raised, but stricken 4 August 1944
 , a Type 206 submarine of the Federal Navy that was launched in 1974 and scrapped in 1996

See also
 , a  submarine of the Austro-Hungarian Navy

Submarines of Germany